Dovid Katz (Yiddish: , also , Hirshe-Dovid Kats, born 9 May 1956) is an American-born, Vilnius Lithuania-based scholar, author and educator, specializing in Yiddish language and literature, Lithuanian Jewish culture, and the Holocaust in Eastern Europe. In recent years, he has been known for combating the so-called "Double Genocide" revision of Holocaust history which asserts a moral equivalence between Nazi Germany and the Soviet Union. He is editor of the web journal Defending History which he founded in 2009. He is known to spend part of each year at his home in North Wales. His website includes a list of his books, of some articles by topic, a record of recent work, and a more comprehensive bibliography.

Early life and Yiddish studies 
Born in the New York City borough of Brooklyn into the Litvak (Lithuanian Jewish) family of Yiddish and English poet Menke Katz, Dovid Katz attended the Brooklyn day schools Hebrew Institute of Boro Park and East Midwood Jewish Day School, and then Yeshivah of Flatbush High School, where he led a student protest calling for the inclusion of Yiddish in American Hebrew day school curricula, and founded and edited the Yiddish-English student journal "Aleichem Sholem" (1972–1974). He majored in linguistics at Columbia University, where he graduated in 1978, having studied concurrently at New York's Herzliah Yiddish Teachers' Seminary. He relocated to London in 1978 to work on a doctorate (completed in 1982) on the origins of the Semitic component in the Yiddish language at the University of London, where he won the John Marshall Medal in Comparative Philology (1980).

In his early linguistic work, he began to argue for "continual transmission" of the Semitic component in Yiddish from Hebrew through to Aramaic through to Yiddish, challenging the standard "text theory" that postulated entrance principally via religious texts later on. He proposed novel reconstructions for parts of the proto-Yiddish vowel system, modifications in the classification of Yiddish dialects, and joined the school of Yiddish scholars that argues for a more easterly (Danube basin) origin of Yiddish over the western (Rhineland) hypothesis, bringing to the table Semitic component evidence; it was in that connection that he came across a thirteenth-century Hebrew and Aramaic prayerbook manuscript in the Bodleian that exhibited the vowel system he had earlier, in his thesis, reconstructed as underlying that of the Semitic component in Yiddish.

Over the years he published papers in Yiddish and English on various "history of ideas" topics, including the role of Aramaic in Aramaic-Hebrew-Yiddish internal Ashkenazi trilingualism (he rejected the notion of a single fused Hebrew-hyphen-Aramaic); medieval rabbinic disputes over Yiddish; rabbinic contributions to Yiddish dialectology; the importance of the German underworld language Rotwelsch for Yiddish linguistics; Christian studies in Yiddish; and the 19th century roots of religious Yiddishism, among others.

For eighteen years (1978–1996) he taught Yiddish Studies at Oxford, building the Oxford Programme in Yiddish. His contributions include initiating a new four-week summer course at four levels of language instruction (in 1982), the annual Stencl Lecture (from 1983), annual winter symposiums (from 1985); University of Oxford BA, MSt and MPhil options (from 1982), and a doctoral program (from 1984), these being concentrated in the University's Faculty of Medieval and Modern Languages. Some of his former doctoral students are today professors of Yiddish, at Indiana University (Bloomington) and Düsseldorf among others. He founded the series Winter Studies in Yiddish in English (vol. 1 appeared in 1987), and Oksforder Yidish (or "Oxford Yiddish"), entirely in Yiddish (vol. 1 appeared in 1990). His posts, at the Oxford Centre for Postgraduate Hebrew Studies (renamed the Oxford Centre for Hebrew and Jewish Studies) were instructor and junior fellow (1978–1982), senior research fellow and director of Yiddish studies (1983–1994). In 1994 he founded the Oxford Institute for Yiddish Studies and served as its research director until 1997. He was Research Fellow at St. Antony's College Oxford from 1986 to 1997, and a member of the Modern Language Faculty's Graduate Studies Committee from 1984 to 1997.

After an initial trip to his ancestral Lithuania and Belarus in 1990 (during which he negotiated an agreement enabling Lithuanian students to enroll in Oxford Jewish studies courses), Katz pioneered the mounting of in-situ post-Holocaust Yiddish dialectological and folkloristic expeditions in Eastern Europe. He focused on the "Lithuanian lands" (Belarus, Lithuania, Latvia, etc.) and continues work on his Atlas of Northeastern Yiddish. He has amassed thousands of hours of recorded interviews with "the last of the Yiddish Mohicans" in these regions but as far as is known has thus far failed to find a permanent home for the materials. In early 2013 he began posting clips from his interviews of Boro Park Yiddish speakers gleaned from his return trips to his native Brooklyn.

His publications on Yiddish language include his "Grammar of the Yiddish Language" (London, 1987) and his book in Yiddish, "Tikney takones. Fragn fun yidisher stilistik" (Oxford, 1993), both of which aimed to enhance the teaching of Yiddish as a vibrant language both spoken and for new literary and academic works, even if in (and for) small circles. In both works, he advocated a descriptivist stance, rejecting what he considered to be the excessive purism prevalent in the field, particularly in New York. He also (controversially) championed the traditionalist variant of modern Yiddish orthography, and was the author of the "Code of Yiddish Spelling" (Oxford, 1992). He twice founded and directed (one-time only) Yiddish teacher training programs: at Oxford, a one-year program in 1996, and at Vilnius, an intensive course in spring 2005.

For a nonspecialist English readership he wrote a history of the language and its culture, "Words on Fire: The Unfinished Story of Yiddish" (Basic Books 2004, revised edition with added academic apparatus, 2007), which attracted both acclaim and robust criticism, particularly over his predictions of a vernacular future for Yiddish based in Haredi communities, and his contention that modern Hebrew could not replace the European-nuanced vibrancy of Yiddish. For years he wrote regular columns for the Forverts (1990s), and in more recent years for the Algemeiner Journal, which seemed to have stopped with the departure of Y.Y. Jacobson as editor around 2010. In 2015, his book Yiddish and Power was published in the UK by Palgrave Macmillan.

He is the author of a number of articles on Yiddish in encyclopedias (including The YIVO Encyclopedia of Jews in Eastern Europe) and book introductions, including the Yivo's reprint of Alexander Harkavy's trilingual Yiddish-English-Hebrew dictionary.

After a year as visiting professor at Yale University (1998–1999), Katz relocated to Vilnius in 1999 in order to take up a new chair in Yiddish language, literature and culture at Vilnius University, and to found the university's Center for Stateless Cultures, which he directed for its first two years. He had relocated his old Oxford Yiddish summer program to Vilnius a year earlier (summer 1998). In 2001, he co-founded the Vilnius Yiddish Institute at Vilnius University and remained its research director and primary instructor until 2010. His works on Litvak (Lithuanian Jewish) culture include the folio volume "Lithuanian Jewish Culture" (Baltos lankos, Vilnius 2004, revised edition 2010), "Windows to a Lost Jewish Past: Vilna Book Stamps" (Versus aureus, Vilnius 2008), and "Seven Kingdoms of the Litvaks" (International Cultural Program Center, Vilnius 2009). In 2009 he directed the "Jewish Lithuania" program for Summer Literary Seminars in Vilnius. He has proposed "Litvak Studies" as a potential program of study.

He began to write short stories in Yiddish following his father's death in 1991, and published four collections in book form under the nom de plume  (Yiddish: —Hirshe-Dovid Meynkes): Eldra Don, 1992; The Flat Peak, 1993; Tales of the Misnagdim from Vilna Province, 1996; Einstein from Svir and Other Yiddish Short Stories, 2020. After experimenting with modern themes in the 1990s, he abandoned them for the vanished life of old Jewish Lithuania, to some extent violating norms of modern Yiddish to write works set in older Jewish Lithuania in local dialect. Awards for his fiction came from within the secular Yiddish environment: the Hirsh Rosenfeld Award (Canadian Jewish Congress, 1994), the Zhitlovsky Prize (Ikuf, 1996) the Itzik Manger Prize, in 1997, and the Leyb Rubinlicht Award (Leyvik House, 2020). In 1994 he founded at Oxford the then sole literary monthly magazine in Yiddish, "Yiddish Pen" and edited its first 27 issues. It did not, however, usher in the literary revival he had hoped for, and his own works of fiction received little recognition outside the narrow world of secular Yiddish culture. Still, translated anthologies of his short stories appeared in 2012, in English and in German, but received little critical attention. In 2001-2002 he was a Guggenheim Fellow in Yiddish literature.

Katz, taken aback by the poverty he found among the last aged Yiddish speakers in Eastern Europe (many of them "flight survivors" who survived the war by fleeing to the Soviet Union, hence not eligible for aid under the narrow definition of "Holocaust survivor"), alerted the wider world to the issue in a 1999 op-ed in the Forward, which was cited by Judge Edward R. Korman in the Swiss Banks settlement in the U.S. District Court in 2004. Katz began to work closely with the American Jewish Joint Distribution Committee (JDC) on these issues, and he helped the founders of the Survivor Mitzvah Project by a group based in Santa Monica, California.

In 2012, he took part in the Channel 4 reality series "Jewish Mum of the Year" as one of the judging panel alongside Tracy-Ann Oberman and Richard Ferrer. Most of the reviews of his own appearance judged it negatively and he did not think much of the program himself.

In 2013, he initiated a "Virtual Mini Museum of Old Jewish Vilna" with item descriptions in Yiddish and index in English.

In June 2014, two articles in Tablet magazine focused on the recent history and status of Yiddish linguistics, including his own contributions (and controversies). Katz promptly responded (in Yiddish).

In 2015, he embarked on a project to translate the (Hebrew) Bible into Lithuanian Yiddish. By early 2021, he had posted draft translations of eighteen books. Only two appeared in hard copy pamphlet form: the Book of Ruth in 2017, and, in memory of his mother, who died in 2019, the Book of Esther, in 2020, in which some of the more preposterous characters in the biblical narrative speak an extreme dialect form of Lithuanian Yiddish.

In 2018, to honor the 100th anniversary of the establishment of the modern Lithuanian republic in 1918, he initiated a new online Yiddish "mini-museum" stressing interwar Yiddish-Lithuanian multicultural and bilingual life.

The same year, he launched online a draft version of his Yiddish Cultural Dictionary, which is an English-Yiddish dictionary that stresses cultural specificities, with all discussions of entries in Yiddish; rooted in his descriptivist perspective in Yiddish stylistics, it contains detailed commentary about usage in both Northeastern (Lithuanian) and Central (Polish) dialects of Yiddish. By late 2021, it had around 20,000 entries and half a million words of text.

In late 2021, he initiated the Lithuanian Yiddish Video Archive (LYVA) by putting on line several hundred (unedited) videos from his thirty years of expeditions to the last native speakers of Northeastern ("Lithuanian") Yiddish in Belarus, Latvia, Lithuania, northeastern Poland and eastern Ukraine.

Holocaust history and human rights activism 
After observing the Vilnius scene for years, Dovid Katz began in 2008 to publicly challenge the double genocide theory of World War II and the accusations against Holocaust survivors who survived by joining the Jewish partisans. In a Rothschild Foundation London seminar in February that year he proposed the term "Holocaust obfuscation" for an East European trend to downgrade the Holocaust into one of two purportedly equal genocides (without actually denying any deaths); he refined the term in a 2009 paper. When, in May 2008, Lithuanian prosecutors launched investigations of two more elderly Holocaust survivors, Fania Yocheles Brantsovsky and Dr. Rachel Margolis, Katz embarked on a new activist phase of his life. He became a staunch advocate for the accused Holocaust survivors who were under investigation, and played a role in mobilizing the Western diplomatic community in Vilnius to support them. Results, achieved in partnership with Vilnius-based diplomats, included a reception by the Irish ambassador for Ms. Brantsovsky, awarding her a certificate, on 3 June 2008 (the same day the Prague Declaration on European Conscience and Communism was signed), and a certificate of merit from the American ambassador. This was followed in August that year by a letter from nine NATO-member embassies to Dr. Rachel Margolis in Rehovot, Israel, and, in 2010, by a letter from seven European ambassadors that noted the legalization of swastikas that year, renewed Holocaust denial, and the attempts to "equalize" Nazi and Soviet crimes.

Professor Katz was apparently the first to publicly challenge the 2008 Prague Declaration in two May 2009 op-eds, in The Jewish Chronicle and The Irish Times. He subsequently contributed articles to The Guardian (in 2010), Tablet magazine (2010), The Jerusalem Post (2011), the London Jewish News (2012), The Times of Israel (2012), and other publications. He has lectured on these issues at the Jewish National Fund in Adelaide, Australia (May 2011), Lund University in Sweden (May 2010), Monash University in Melbourne (June 2011), Musée d'Aquitaine in Bordeaux (March 2012), Rutgers University (Nov 2008), University of Pennsylvania (Nov 2008), University of South Carolina at Columbia (March 2011), the Woodrow Wilson Center's Kennan Institute in Washington, D.C. (March 2011), University of London (April 2009), and Yeshiva University (March 2011), among others.

His professorship at Vilnius University was terminated after eleven years in 2010 after he published several articles critical of Lithuanian prosecutors' campaign against Holocaust survivors who joined the partisans. He began (and continues) to lecture quite widely. In 2016 was appointed professor (on an adjunct basis) at Vilnius Gediminas Technical University (VGTU), in the Department of Philosophy and Cultural Studies, where he taught courses in Creative Writing and Ethics, until taking leave in 2020.

In September 2009 Katz launched the openly partisan online journal HolocaustInTheBaltics.com, which was renamed a year later DefendingHistory.com, and came to include contributions by several dozen authors; it has sections on the regional glorification of local Nazi collaborators, and the related "exotic tourism" as well as Opinion, Books, Film and History sections. Over time, DefendingHistory has also become one of the addresses for resources in Litvak (Lithuanian Jewish) affairs, including culture, history, news, tourism and "dark tourism."

In 2012 he co-authored (with Danny Ben-Moshe) The Seventy Years Declaration, signed on the occasion of the 70th anniversary of the Wannsee Conference by 71 European parliamentarians (MPs and MEPs, including Conservatives and Liberals as well as Social Democrats and Labor, also—eight Lithuanian Social Democratic parliamentarians). He was invited to present it formally to Martin Schulz, president of the European Parliament, in Strasbourg on March 14, 2012.

Katz's work on the Holocaust in Lithuania and related antisemitism issues was among the subjects of a 2010 BBC world service program by Wendy Robbins, and a 2012 Australian documentary film by Marc Radomsky and Danny Ben-Moshe. He has participated in various public debates on these subjects, and has publicly disagreed with Yale Professor Timothy D. Snyder on the related history, in a 2010 Guardian debate preceding publication of Snyder's Bloodlands in a book review in East European Jewish Studies (2011), and an open letter during the controversy over the reburial with full honors in 2012 of the 1941 Nazi puppet prime minister in Lithuania. He also engaged in public debate with the director of YIVO and the Economist's Edward Lucas.

His work in the field of human rights has included on-site protest and monitoring of state-sanctioned city-center nationalist parades in Vilnius and Kaunas in Lithuania, and Waffen-SS parades in the Latvian capital Riga, taking note also of anti-Polish, anti-Russian, anti-Roma and anti-gay signs, slogans and publications. In 2013 he added an LGBT rights section to Defending History. Twice, in 2010 and in 2011, he appeared in Budapest to report on what he regarded as "sensationally absurd" trials of Holocaust historian and Nazi-hunter Efraim Zuroff, director of the Wiesenthal Center's Israel office, on charges of "libel" leveled by a twice-convicted Nazi war criminal whom Dr. Zuroff had exposed. On the subject of free speech, he has been a vocal critic of Lithuania's 2010 law forbidding the denial or trivialization of Soviet and Nazi genocide, which he believes, in agreement with Leonidas Donskis, to constitute criminalization of debate. When the law was applied to a left-wing politician with whom he disagreed wholly on the 1991 events in question, Katz nevertheless felt it important to speak out for free speech, and, in a reply to Rokas Grajauskas in Lithuanian Foreign Policy Review made clear his view that objecting to Holocaust Obfuscation in no way signifies reluctance to expose Stalinist crimes.

In recent years, Katz has registered concern regarding purported policy shifts toward Holocaust Obfuscation and Double Genocide by the United States Department of State, in articles in Tablet (2010), The Guardian (2010) Algemeiner Journal (2011), The Times of Israel (2012) and a list of publications maintained on DefendingHistory.com. He also spoke out regarding alliances binding the UK's Conservative Party with controversial East European right wing politics, in The Irish Times (2009), The Guardian (2010), The Jewish Chronicle (2010), and the London Jewish News (2012). Analogously, he challenged Israeli foreign policy on alleged acequiscence to Holocaust Obfuscation in return for diplomatic support, in venues including the Israel Journal of Foreign Affairs, The Jerusalem Post, The Times of Israel  and DefendingHistory.com.

In the spring of 2011, Katz was Jan Randa Visiting Scholar at the Australian Center for Jewish Civilization (ACJC) at Monash University in Melbourne where he lectured on both Yiddish Studies and Holocaust issues. He has worked to define the new and "nuanced" elitist East European antisemitism and its success in attracting unsuspecting westerners to help provide political cover. He presented findings at Yale University and the Woodrow Wilson International Center for Scholars in 2011, and at a December 13, 2012 ISGAP event at Fordham University in New York City. He participated in the April 18, 2013 seminar on " issues" in Berlin, and a May 27–28, 2013 conference in Riga on Holocaust commemoration in post-communist Eastern Europe. A Spring 2016 lecture tour included lectures on Yiddish, Litvak and Holocaust topics at the University of Toronto and York University in Toronto; UCLA in Los Angeles; ISGAP, Baruch College, and the Mid-Manhattan New York Public Library in New York; Fairfield University and Yale in Connecticut. In Sept. 2016 he was appointed professor at another university in Vilnius, VGTU, in its Department of Philosophy and Cultural Studies. 

Germany's Federal Agency for Civic Education (FACE, German: Bundeszentrale für politische Bildung (bpb)) hired Katz in 2021 to classify today's historical significance of eighty years since Operation Barbarossa (Germany's attack on the Soviet Union) where the Nazis (prior to the "Wannseekonferenz") experienced that Holocaust in the Eastern Territories ("the Bloodlands") was "doable", not least because nationalist leaders in the Baltic States and the Ukraine, hated the Soviet Union and Russia much more than collaborating with Nazis. Bandera, Norieka and Skirpa whose ideas were responsible for mass killings of Jews and Poles, still today (2023) are honored by street names and plaques as freedom fighters in their respective countries.

Unexpectedly for many in his circles, he became, in 2015, a staunch opponent of plans to locate a national convention center on the grounds of Vilnius's 15th century-origin old Jewish cemetery. His activities included helping inspire an array of international published protest statements, maintaining a monitoring section in Defending History. One summary of his views appeared in The Times of Israel in late 2015. He has argued that the rights of the dead, especially those in long-ago paid-for burial plots, include the right to be left in peace.

Katz keeps an online record of his published writings, and a separate list of papers on Holocaust Studies in academic format. A few reflections on his life were recorded in April 2016 by Larry Yudelson in The Jewish Standard, and in August of the same year by Inga Liutkevičienė in Bernardinai.lt.

References

External links 
 DovidKatz.net, Dovid Katz's website
 DefendingHistory.com, web journal founded and edited by Dovid Katz
 Academia.Edu, Dovid Katz's papers
 Dovid Katz's Yiddish Cultural Dictionary

1956 births
Living people
Fellows of St Antony's College, Oxford
Alumni of the University of London
21st-century American historians
21st-century American male writers
American male non-fiction writers
Columbia University alumni
Historians of the Holocaust
Jewish historians
Linguists of Yiddish
Lithuanian Jews
American people of Lithuanian-Jewish descent
People from Brooklyn
Yiddish-language writers
Academic staff of Vilnius University
Academics of the Oxford Centre for Hebrew and Jewish Studies
Yiddish-speaking people
Historians from New York (state)
Itzik Manger Prize recipients